A pixie (also pisky, pixy, pixi, pizkie, and piskie in Cornwall and Devon, and pigsie or puggsy in the New Forest) is a mythical creature of British folklore. Pixies are considered to be particularly concentrated in the high moorland areas around Devon and Cornwall, and in the New Forest area of Dorset and Hampshire.

Akin to Anglo-Saxon elves and the Irish and Scottish Aos Sí (also spelt Aos Sidhe), pixies are believed to inhabit ancient underground ancestor sites such as stone circles, barrows, dolmens, ringforts or menhirs. In traditional regional lore, pixies are generally mischievous, short of stature and childlike; they are fond of dancing and gather outdoors in huge numbers to dance, or sometimes wrestle, through the night.

Though in the modern era they are often depicted with pointed ears, a green outfit and a peaked hat, traditionally they are described as round eared, and sometimes as wearing dirty ragged bundles of rags which they happily discard for gifts of new clothes.

Etymology and origin 

The origin of the word pixie is uncertain. Some have speculated that it is connected to the Swedish dialectal pyske meaning 'small fairy'. Others have theorised it may be Celtic in origin, though no clear ancestor of the word is known. 

In older Westcountry dialect modern Received Pronunciation letter pairs are sometimes transposed from the older Saxon spelling (waps for wasp, aks for ask and so on) resulting in piskies in place of modern piksies (pixies) as still commonly found in Devon and Cornwall to modern times. In Cornwall the term Pobel Vean ('Little People') is often used to refer to them collectively. 

Similar beings exist in Irish (Aos Sí), Manx (Mooinjer veggey) Welsh Tylwyth Teg ('Fair Family'), and Breton (korrigan) folklore, although their common names are unrelated, and even within areas of language survival there is a very high degree of local variation of names. Similarities have also been noted between Germanic and Anglo-Saxon elves, but despite such analogues until the advent of modern literary fiction pixie mythology was localised exclusively to Southern and South Western England. 

By 1869 some were suggesting that the name pixie was a racial remnant of Pictic tribes who used to paint and tattoo their skin blue, as with the Irish fairy tradition of the "Pecht". This suggestion is still met in contemporary writing, but there is no proven connection and the etymology is doubtful. Some 19th-century researchers made more general claims about pixie origins, or have connected them with the Puck (Cornish Bucca), a mythological creature sometimes described as a fairy; the name Puck is also of uncertain origin; Old English Puca, Irish Púca, Welsh Pwca. One British scholar stated his belief that "Pixies were evidently a smaller race, and, from the greater obscurity of the ... tales about them, I believe them to have been an earlier race."

Localised traditions 
Before the mid-19th century, pixies and fairies were taken seriously in much of Southern England. Books devoted to the homely beliefs of the peasantry are filled with incidents of pixie manifestations, and often locales are named for the pixies associated with them. Specific details of the folklore often vary by location, though broad details are held in common. They are often described as ill-clothed or naked. In 1890, William Crossing noted a pixie's preference for bits of finery: "Indeed, a sort of weakness for finery exists among them, and a piece of ribbon appears to be... highly prized by them."

Some pixies are said to steal children or to lead travellers astray. Some consider this a cross-over from fairy mythology, and believe it may not have originally been attached to pixies; in 1850, Thomas Keightley observed that much of Devon pixie mythology may have originated from fairy myth. Pixies are said to reward consideration and punish neglect on the part of larger humans, for which Keightley gives examples. By their presence they bring blessings to those who are fond of them.

Pixies are said to be drawn to horses, riding them for pleasure and making tangled ringlets in the manes of those horses they ride. They are "great explorers familiar with the caves of the ocean, the hidden sources of the streams and the recesses of the land."

By the early 19th century their contact with humans had diminished. In Samuel Drew’s 1824 book Cornwall one finds the observation: "The age of pixies, like that of chivalry, is gone. There is, perhaps, at present hardly a house they are reputed to visit. Even the fields and lanes which they formerly frequented seem to be nearly forsaken. Their music is rarely heard."

Cornwall 

The queen of the Cornish pixies is said to be Joan the Wad (torch), and she is considered to be good luck or bring good luck. At Trevose Head 600 pixies were said to have gathered dancing and laughing in a circle that had appeared upon the turf until one of them, named Omfra, lost his laugh. After searching amongst the barrows of the ancient kings of Cornwall on St Breock Downs, he wades through the bottomless Dozmary Pool on Bodmin Moor until his laugh is restored by King Arthur in the form of a Chough.

Devon 

In Devon, pixies are said to be "invisibly small, and harmless or friendly to man." In the legends associated with Dartmoor, pixies are said to disguise themselves as a bundle of rags to lure children into their play, and near Challacombe a group of rocks are named after the pixies said to dwell there. The pixies of Dartmoor are fond of music and dancing and for riding on Dartmoor colts. These pixies are generally said to be helpful to normal humans, sometimes helping needy widows and others with housework. They are not completely benign however, as they have a reputation for misleading travellers (being "pixy-led", the remedy for which is to turn your coat inside out).

In some of the legends and historical accounts they are presented as having near-human stature. For instance, a member of the Elford family in Tavistock, Devon, successfully hid from Cromwell's troops in a pixie house. Though the entrance has narrowed with time, the pixie house, a natural cavern on Sheep Tor, is still accessible.

The earliest published version of The Three Little Pigs story is from Dartmoor in 1853 and has three little pixies in place of the pigs.

Pixie Day 

Pixie Day is an old tradition which takes place annually in the East Devon town of Ottery St. Mary in June. The day commemorates a legend of pixies being banished from the town to local caves known as the "Pixie's Parlour".

The Pixie Day legend supposedly originates in the early period of Christianity, when a local bishop decided to build a church in Otteri (Ottery St. Mary), and commissioned a set of bells to come from Wales, and to be escorted by monks on their journey.

On hearing of this, the pixies were worried, as they knew that once the bells were installed it would be the death knell of their rule over the land. So they cast a spell over the monks to redirect them from the road to Otteri to the road leading them to the cliff's edge at Sidmouth. Just as the monks were about to fall over the cliff, one of the monks stubbed his toe on a rock and said "God bless my soul" and the spell was broken.

The bells were then brought to Otteri and installed. However, the pixies' spell was not completely broken; each year on a day in June the "pixies" come out and capture the town's bell ringers and imprison them in Pixies' Parlour to be rescued by the Vicar of Ottery St. Mary. This legend is re-enacted each year by the Cub and Brownie groups of Ottery St. Mary, with a specially constructed Pixies' Parlour in the Town Square (the original Pixie's Parlour can be found along the banks of the River Otter).

Somerset 

At Buckland St. Mary, Somerset, pixies and fairies are said to have battled each other. Here the pixies were victorious and still visit the area, whilst the fairies are said to have left after their loss.

The New Forest 

The New Forest pixie tradition is less domestic than elsewhere, and they are not believed to engage in household chores or to be interested in offerings of milk, clothes, food or similar. Though usually small, they can change their height at will, and appear as strange looking, wizened old men (never as women) with pale skin and round ears. New Forest pixies are also believed to change their shape, taking on the form of the Colt pixie (a pale, ragged, "off looking" New Forest Pony colt), or sometimes of a Will-o'-the-wisp. The Colt Pixie is sometimes considered a type of pixie in its own right, and is heavily associated with the New Forest, especially at the barrow known as Cold Pixie Cave on Beaulieu Heath.

The king of the New Forest pixies is either Gran Collin (a giant pixie, much larger than a human) or his twin brother Tiddie Cole ("about the size of a human thumb"). Other named local pixies are Lazy Laurence (who protects orchards and cider), Watt (who grants witches power), and Puck (also known as Tom Puck or Pugg).

In local topography they are connected to various landmarks and barrows, including Pixie Field; Ragged Boy's Hill; Laurence's Barrow; Cole's Hole; Collin's Grave; Watt's Parlour; Gran's Barrow; Tom Puck's Hill near Fritham; Robin Farm and Puck Pits in Emery Down; Pikes Hill and Cole's Mead in Lyndhurst.

Literary traditions 
The conflation of pixies with fairies, as well as their pointy ears and sprite-like elements, originate with the Victorian Romantic literary tradition. Many Victorian-era poets saw them as magical beings. An example is Samuel Minturn Peck; in his poem The Pixies he writes:

‘Tis said their forms are tiny, yet
All human ills they can subdue,
Or with a wand or amulet
Can win a maiden’s heart for you;
And many a blessing know to stew
To make to wedlock bright;
Give honour to the dainty crew,
The Pixies are abroad tonight.

The late 19th-century English poet Nora Chesson summarised pixie mythology fairly well in a poem entitled The Pixies. She gathered all the speculations and myths into verse:

She touches on all the essentials, including even more modern accretions. Pixies are "in-between", not cursed by God or especially blessed. They do the unexpected, they bless the land, and are forest creatures whom other wild creatures find alluring and non-threatening. They love humans, taking some for mates, and are nearly ageless. They are winged, flitting from place to place.

The Pixie Day tradition in Samuel Taylor Coleridge’s hometown of Ottery St Mary in East Devon was the inspiration for his poem Songs of the Pixies.

The Victorian-era writer Mary Elizabeth Whitcombe divided pixies into tribes according to personality and deeds. The novelist Anna Eliza Bray suggested that pixies and fairies were distinct species.

See also 
 Colt pixie
 Goblin
 Harry Potter and the Chamber of Secrets (Cornish pixies appear in the charlatan Gilderoy Lockhart’s Defence Against the Dark Arts class).
 Jinn
 Leprechaun
 Nisse/Tomte
 Peter and the Piskies: Cornish Folk and Fairy Tales
 Pixie (comics)
 PopPixie
 Puck
 Sylph
 Tinker Bell

References 

 
Cornish culture
Cornish folklore
Devon folklore
New Forest folklore
Cornish legendary creatures
Fairies
Gnomes
Elves
Limbo